Microphysogobio liaohensis is a species of cyprinid fish found in the Liaohe River in China.

References

Cyprinid fish of Asia
Freshwater fish of China
Fish described in 1987
Microphysogobio